Michael Sullivan (12 January 1934 – 5 April 2016), also known by the nickname of "Sully", was an English World Cup winning professional rugby league footballer who played in the 1950s and 1960s, and coached in the 1970s. He set the record for the most appearances for the Great Britain Lions with 46. This record has been matched (by Garry Schofield) but never overtaken. He also holds the record for the most rugby league test match tries by a player of any nationality with 44.

Background
Mick Sullivan was born in Pudsey, West Riding of Yorkshire, England, he worked a pipefitter, and he died aged 82 in Wakefield, West Yorkshire, England.

Playing career
Sullivan signed with Huddersfield in 1952 as an 18-year-old . He made his début for Great Britain during the 1954 World Cup in France against the Australian team. Sullivan went on to appear in the final and help Great Britain to claim the first ever World Cup. He was selected to play for England while at Huddersfield in 1955 against Other Nationalities, and in 1956 against France. Mick Sullivan also represented Great Britain while at Huddersfield between 1952 and 1956 against France (2 non-Test matches).

Sullivan won caps for Great Britain while at Huddersfield in 1954 against France (2 matches), New Zealand, and Australia, in 1955 against New Zealand (3 matches), in 1956 against Australia (3 matches), in 1957 against France (3 matches), France, Australia, New Zealand, while at Wigan against France (2 matches), in 1958 against France, Australia (3 matches), and New Zealand (2 matches), in 1959 against France (2 matches) and Australia (3 matches), in 1960 against France (3 matches), France, New Zealand and Australia, while at St. Helens in 1961 against France, and New Zealand (2 matches), in 1962 against France (3 matches), Australia (3 matches), and New Zealand, and while at York in 1963 against Australia (World Cup 1954 3-caps, 1-try, 1957 3-caps, 3-tries, 1960 3-caps, 1-try).

Sullivan was signed by Wigan for a record fee of £9,500 in 1957 (based on increases in average earnings, this would be approximately £480,900 in 2013).

Mick Sullivan represented Great Britain & France in the 37–31 victory over New Zealand at Carlaw Park, Auckland on 3 July 1957.

He scored a try against Australia in 1960, when he became the only British player to win the World Cup twice.

He was later signed by St. Helens in 1961 for a new world record fee of £11,000. (based on increases in average earnings, this would be approximately £484,000 in 2013). Sullivan played his first game for St. Helens in January 1961. While at St. Helens, Sullivan played for England in 1962 against France.

Sullivan moved to Australia and captain-coached the Junee team in the Group 9 competition in southern New South Wales for 3 years from 1966 until 1968.

Challenge Cup Final appearances
Mick Sullivan played , i.e. number 5, and scored a try in Wigan's 13–9 victory over Workington Town in the 1957–58 Challenge Cup Final during the 1957–58 season at Wembley Stadium, London on Saturday 10 May 1958, in front of a crowd of 66,109, and played , and scored a try in the 30-13 victory over Hull F.C. in the 1958–59 Challenge Cup Final during the 1958–59 season at Wembley Stadium, London on Saturday 9 May 1959, in front of a crowd of 79,811, and played  in St. Helens 12-6 victory over Wigan in the 1960–61 Challenge Cup Final during the 1960–61 season at Wembley Stadium, London on Saturday 13 May 1961, in front of a crowd of 94,672

County Cup Final appearances
Mick Sullivan played , i.e. number 5, in Huddersfield's 15–8 victory over York in the 1957–58 Yorkshire County Cup Final during the 1957–58 season at Headingley Rugby Stadium, Leeds on Saturday 19 October 1957, played , and scored a try, in St. Helens' 25–9 victory over Swinton in the 1961–62 Lancashire County Cup Final during the 1961–62 season at Central Park, Wigan on Saturday 11 November 1961, and played  in the 7–4 victory over Swinton in the 1962–63 Lancashire County Cup Final during the 1962–63 season at Central Park, Wigan on Saturday 27 October 1962.

Coaching career
Mick Sullivan was the coach of Batley from June 1970 to October 1970, during this period he also worked a pipefitter during the building of Fiddlers Ferry power station.

Death
It was announced on 5 April 2016 that he had died in the previous week, aged 82.

References

External links
Mick Sullivan – Wigan Career Page @ Cherryandwhite.co.uk
Mick Sullivan – St. Helens Career Page at saints.org.uk
(archived by web.archive.org) Mick Sullivan at rlhalloffame.org.uk
Mick Sullivan at britannica.com
Mick Sullivan at rugbyleagueoralhistory.co.uk

1934 births
2016 deaths
Army rugby union players
Batley Bulldogs coaches
Dewsbury Rams players
England national rugby league team players
English rugby league coaches
English rugby league players
Great Britain & France rugby league team players
Great Britain national rugby league team players
Huddersfield Giants players
Rugby league centres
Rugby league halfbacks
Rugby league wingers
Rugby league players from Pudsey
St Helens R.F.C. players
Wigan Warriors players
York Wasps players
Yorkshire rugby league team players